Malaysian AIDS Council (abbrev: MAC) was established in 1992 under the Ministry of Health (MOH) with a mission to represent, mobilise and strengthen non-governmental organisations and communities who were working with HIV/AIDS issues. The Malaysian AIDS Council began with an umbrella of 18 NGOs who were directly working on the various aspects of HIV/AIDS issues.

Objectives 
MAC complements and supports the government's efforts to maximise the community's response to HIV/AIDS and to maximise the usage of limited resources available. The primary objectives of MAC are to:
 Increase awareness of HIV/AIDS
 Prevent the spread of HIV
 Eliminate discrimination, stigma and prejudice associated with HIV/AIDS
 Promote and protect the rights of those made vulnerable to HIV/AIDS
 Ensure the highest possible quality of life for those with HIV/AIDS
 Provide care and support to individuals with HIV/AIDS

Scope of work 
MAC works with its partner organisations in a diverse range of activities from advocating and policy reforms; developing awareness and communication materials; creating public awareness campaigns; conducting and organising workshops and seminars; rolling out prevention and education programmes; providing care and support services and psychological counselling.

Special projects 
MAC also works on special projects, including Needle and Syringe Programme (NSEP) which strives to reduce the unsafe practice of sharing needles and syringes by infected injecting drug users (IDU).

Malaysian AIDS Foundation 
The Malaysian AIDS Foundation (MAF) raises money and manages funds to support the activities of the Malaysian AIDS Council and its Partner Organisations. Celebrities have lent their time and faces to generate monies for MAC, and large corporations, both international and local, from Standard Chartered Trust Fund , Mercedes-Benz Malaysia , Hong Leong Bank Bhd, L'Oreal Malaysia , Shell, Levi Strauss Foundation .

Partner organizations
MAC is led by an Executive Committee (EXCO) comprising ten elected representatives from the Partner Organisations which comprises a diverse range of associations, from the medical industry, religious based communities to the nation's legal institutes. The Partner Organisations that make up MAC are:
 AIDS Action and Research Group (AARG)
 Association of Malaysian Medical Assistants 
 Bar Council
 Buddhist Missionary Society Malaysia (BMSM) 
 Catholic Welfare Services (CWS)
 Community AIDS Service Penang (CASP) 
 DiC Pahang
 Federation of Reproductive Health Associations, Malaysia (FRHAM) 
 Harapan Komuniti Sdn Berhad
 He Intends Victory (M) Berhad
 Intan Drop-in Society, Teluk Intan (PKI)
 Islamic Medical Association of Malaysia
 Kuala Lumpur AIDS Support Services (KLASS)
 Kota Kinabalu AIDS Support Services Association (KASIH)
 Malaysian CARE
 Malaysian Consultative Council of Buddhism, Christianity, Hinduism, Sikhism and Taoism (MCCBCHST)
 Malaysian Dental Association (MDA) 
 Malaysian Indian Youth Council (MIYC) 
 Malaysian Medical Association (MMA) 
 Malaysian Red Crescent Society
 Malaysian Youth Council (MYC) 
 Malaysian Hindu Youth Council (MHYC)
 National Council of Women's Organisations (NCWO)
 Natural Therapy Centre (NTC)
 Obstetrical and Gynaecological Society of Malaysia (O&G) 
 Persatuan Perantaraan Pesakit-Pesakit Kelantan (SAHABAT)
 Persatuan Insaf Murni Malaysia (PIMM)
 Pertubuhan Masyarakat Prihatin (PRIHATIN)
 Pertubuhan Kebajikan Intan Zon Kehidupan Johor Bahru
 PT Foundation
 Sarawak AIDS Concern Society (SACS) 
 Selangor and Federal Territory Federation of Reproductive Health Associations, Malaysia
 Shekinah Home Services Sdn Bhd
 Soroptimist International Club of Bangsar (SICB) 
 St. John Ambulance of Malaysia
 The Boys' Brigade in Malaysia
 Tenaganita Sdn Bhd (Tenaganita) 
 The Buddies of Ipoh 
 The Estates Hospital Assistants Association, Peninsular Malaysia (EHAA)
 The Selangor Chinese Assembly Hall (SCA) 
 Women's Aid Organisation
 Women & Health Association of Kuala Lumpur (WAKE)
 Youth With A Mission Malaysia (YWAM)

See also 

 HIV/AIDS in Malaysia

References 

HIV/AIDS in Malaysia
Organizations established in 1992
Foundations based in Malaysia
Medical and health organisations based in Malaysia
HIV/AIDS organizations